Student Union AKKU (Dutch: Studentenvakbond AKKU) is a Dutch advocacy group for students in Nijmegen, the Netherlands. AKKU was founded in 1981 and is affiliated with the Dutch Student Union. It advocates for the interests of students at a regional level and is active at the Radboud University Nijmegen and the HAN University of Applied Sciences.

In recent years, the student union has been advocating for a reform of the Dutch student loans and solutions to the student housing crisis in Nijmegen

Members

Former (board) members of AKKU include politician Lisa Westerveld and activist Louis Sévèke.

References

External links
Official website

Groups of students' unions